Beatriz Manchón Portillo (born May 29, 1976 in Sevilla) is a Spanish sprint canoer who has competed since the mid-1990s. She won fifteen medals at the ICF Canoe Sprint World Championships with two golds (K-2 200 m: 1999, 2002), three silvers (K-2 200 m: 2003, K-4 200 m: 2002, 2003), and ten bronzes (K-2 200 m: 1998, K-2 500 m: 1997, 2001, 2002; K-2 1000 m: 2001, K-4 500 m: 1997, 1998, 2002, 2003, 2009).

Manchón also competed in four Summer Olympics, earning her best finish of fifth on three occasions (2004: K-2 500 m, K-4 500 m; 2008: K-4 500 m).

References
 Canoe09.ca profile
 
 
 

1976 births
Canoeists at the 1996 Summer Olympics
Canoeists at the 2000 Summer Olympics
Canoeists at the 2004 Summer Olympics
Canoeists at the 2008 Summer Olympics
Living people
Olympic canoeists of Spain
Spanish female canoeists
ICF Canoe Sprint World Championships medalists in kayak
21st-century Spanish women